Hypothymis is a genus of birds in the family Monarchidae.

The genus was introduced by the German zoologist Friedrich Boie in 1826 with the black-naped monarch (Hypothymis azurea) as the type species. The word Hypothymis  is from the Ancient Greek hupothumis, the name of an unidentified bird mentioned by the playwright Aristophanes.

The genus contains four species:
 Black-naped monarch (Hypothymis azurea)
 Pale-blue monarch (Hypothymis puella)
 Short-crested monarch (Hypothymis helenae)
 Celestial monarch (Hypothymis coelestis)

References

 
Bird genera
Taxonomy articles created by Polbot